James Spoors was a professional footballer and manager, who played for Sheffield Wednesday, Barnsley, and Rotherham County, as well as Worksop Town.

Sheffield Wednesday
Spoors joined Sheffield Wednesday in 1908 and played there for twelve years, with a brief period on loan to Rotherham County in 1916, helping them to defeat Sheffield United for the second time that season.

Barnsley
In June 1920 Spoors moved to Barnsley, overcoming a serious knee injury which appeared to have curtailed his playing career, at Sheffield Wednesday. Spoors played primarily at Barnsley as a defender but was unorthodoxly occasionally played as a centre forward, in an experimental capacity by the club, with quite prolific results. Alongside his duties as a player Spoors managed the reserve team, in the Midland League.

First World War
After initially working in a munitions factory Spoors served with the 4th Depot, 302nd Battery Royal Garrison Artillery in France and Italy during the First World War, he was a qualified mechanic. He also represented the army at football when in service.

Post retirement
After retiring from football, Spoors became a talented bowls player, winning the Brewers Bowl in 1933. Spoors was also a licensed victualler and associate member of the Sheffield, Rotherham and District Licensed Victuallers Association, running the Old Blue Ball on Bradfield Road, Hillsborough.

Family
Parish records show that on 14 May 1914 Spoors married Winifred, the daughter of former England and Sheffield Wednesday footballer Jack Hudson. They gave their address as the Castle Inn, Dykes Hall Road, Hillsborough, the public house run by Hudson. Military records show that they had a daughter, Annie Margaret.

References

1880s births
Association football defenders
Sheffield Wednesday F.C. players
Barnsley F.C. players
Rotherham County F.C. players
English Football League players
English footballers
1960 deaths
English football managers
British Army personnel of World War I
Royal Garrison Artillery soldiers
Military personnel from County Durham